Fugitive from a Prison Camp is a 1940 American thriller film directed by Lewis D. Collins and starring Jack Holt, Marian Marsh and Robert Barrat.

Synopsis
After an innocent man is picked up following a police raid, a sheriff tries to demonstrate his belief that first offenders should be given a chance.

Cast
Jack Holt as Sheriff Lawson 
Marian Marsh as Ann Baldwin 
Robert Barrat as Chester Russell 
Phillip Terry as Bill Harding 
Dennis Moore as Slugger Martin 
Jack La Rue as Red Nelson 
George Offerman Jr. as Ted Baldwin 
Frankie Burke as Sobby Taylor 
Donald Haines as Burly Bascomb 
Alan Baldwin as Jerome Davis 
Frank LaRue as Robert O'Brien 
Ernest Morrison as Chuckles

References

External links

1940s thriller films
American thriller films
Films directed by Lewis D. Collins
Columbia Pictures films
1940s American films